Erik Ersberg (born March 8, 1982) is a Swedish retired professional ice hockey goaltender. During his playing career, he made a total of 54 appearances in the National Hockey League with the Los Angeles Kings. He is currently serving as the goaltending coach to the Vienna Capitals of the Austrian Hockey League (EBEL).

Playing career 

Ersberg started his ice hockey career playing for VIK Västerås HK in HockeyAllsvenskan (tier two in the Swedish league structure). For season 2005–06 he joined the Jönköping based elite club HV71. As a backup goalie behind Stefan Liv, Ersberg guarded the net for ten games in his rookie season, ending the regular season with a save percentage of .929. In the Elitserien playoffs 2006 he played in two games with a .857 save percentage.

The following season he got his breakthrough and became starting goaltender for HV71 and was also selected for the Swedish national team in the 2006 Karjala Tournament and Channel One Cup. He is somewhat of a late bloomer as he has never before played for the national team, including youth and junior tournaments. In season 2006–07 he was nominated as the second candidate for the title Elitserien Rookie of the Year. On March 22, 2007 he was awarded the Honken Trophy, which is awarded to the Swedish goaltender of the year. On May 31, 2007, Los Angeles announced on their web site that they have signed Ersberg to a one-year entry-level deal. He started the 2007–08 season playing for Manchester Monarchs in the American Hockey League.

On February 21, 2008, the Kings recalled Ersberg from Manchester, becoming the first Swedish-born goaltender in Los Angeles Kings franchise history.

February 23, 2008, Ersberg made his NHL debut against the Chicago Blackhawks at Staples Center in Los Angeles, California. He replaced Dan Cloutier, who was pulled in the second period with the score 5-1. The Kings scored four goals in the third period to tie the game 5-5 and send it into overtime, where the Blackhawks scored for the 6-5 victory. Ersberg allowed only one goal on 19 shots, but earned the overtime loss.

On March 6, 2008, Ersberg recorded his first career NHL win and shutout. He made 40 saves to defeat the Ottawa Senators 2-0. Ersberg became the first NHL rookie to make at least 40 saves in a shutout since November 14, 1996. He also broke the Kings' franchise single game record for saves by a rookie, breaking Gary Edwards' previous mark of 38 saves during the 1971–72 season.

For the 2010–11 season, Ersberg was assigned to the Manchester Monarchs. He proceed to leave the team without permission and on October 22, 2010, Ersberg was placed on waivers. After clearing waivers two days later he had his contract terminated by the Kings for violating his contract. He has since been playing for the Russian club Salavat Yulaev in KHL, before moving on to fellow KHL side Donbass Donetsk. After spending the 2013–14 season in Germany, representing the Iserlohn Roosters, Ersberg returned to Sweden and spent two years with HV71 of the Swedish Hockey League (SHL). He announced his retirement in July 2016.

International play 

Ersberg made his international debut for Sweden in a single game at the 2007 World Championships. He later competed in two games at the 2011 World Championships, helping claim the silver medal.

Career statistics

Regular season and playoffs

International

Statistics complete.

Awards and honors

References

External links
 
 

1982 births
Living people
HC Donbass players
HV71 players
Iserlohn Roosters players
Los Angeles Kings players
Manchester Monarchs (AHL) players
People from Sala Municipality
Swedish ice hockey goaltenders
Undrafted National Hockey League players
VIK Västerås HK players
Sportspeople from Västmanland County